Dominique Fabre (30 June 1929-20 December 2010) was a Swiss screenwriter and novelist. His book Un Beau Monstre received the Grand Prix de Littérature Policière in 1968. He is not to be confused with the current French author Dominique Fabre.

Fabre started his career as a journalist before becoming a screenwriter. He most frequently worked with film director Étienne Périer. Fabre also wrote three crime novels in the late 1960s and early 1970s. Later in his life, he wrote mostly for television.

Bibliography
Suisse (1955) - non-fiction; published in English as Switzerland (1961, London : Vista Books ; New York : Viking)
Un Beau Monstre (1968)
La Tête en feu (1971)
Un Meurtre est un Meurtre (1972)

Filmography
1957 : Charming Boys, directed by Henri Decoin
1959 : Bobosse, directed by Étienne Périer
1960 : Meurtre en 45 tours, directed by Étienne Périer
1961 : Quai Notre-Dame, directed by Jacques Berthier
1962 : Le Mercenaire (La Congiura dei dieci), co-directed by Baccio Bandini and Étienne Périer
1967 : Des garçons et des filles, directed by Étienne Périer
1968 : Le Rouble à deux faces, directed by Étienne Périer
1971 : Macédoine, directed by Jacques Scandelari
1971 : Un beau monstre, directed by Sergio Gobbi
1972 : Un meurtre est un meurtre, directed by Étienne Périer
1974 : La Main à couper, directed by Étienne Périer
1977 : Servante et Maîtresse, directed by  Bruno Gantillon
1977 : L'Animal, directed by Claude Zidi
1978 : La Part du feu, directed by Étienne Périer

References

20th-century Swiss novelists
Swiss screenwriters
Male screenwriters
Living people
1929 births